Ischia Porto Lighthouse is an active lighthouse located on the northern end of the western mole of the Port of Ischia, Campania on the Tyrrhenian Sea.

Description
The lighthouse is completely automated and is operated by the Marina Militare with the identification code number 2374 E.F.

See also
 List of lighthouses in Italy
 Ischia

References

External links

 Servizio Fari Marina Militare

Lighthouses in Italy